Dorstenia carautae is a species of herbaceous plant in the family Moraceae which is native to eastern Brazil.

References

carautae
Plants described in 1986
Flora of Brazil